Johnny Hodges is an American football linebacker for the TCU Horned Frogs. He previously played at the United States Naval Academy.

Early life and high school
Hodges grew up in Darnestown, Maryland and attended Quince Orchard High School, where he played basketball, football, and lacrosse. He committed to play college lacrosse at the United States Naval Academy.

College career
Hodges played lacrosse for Navy as a freshman and played in one game before the season was canceled due to the COVID-19 pandemic in the United States. He joined the Navy football entering the 2020 season and played in seven games. Hodges played in nine games during his sophomore season and recorded 50 tackles with one tackle for loss, one sack, one interception, 4 passes defended, and a forced fumble. Following the end of the season, he entered the NCAA transfer portal.

Hodges ultimately transferred to TCU. He became a starter at linebacker during his first season with the team. Hodges was named the Big 12 Conference Newcomer of the Year and second-team All-Conference at the end of the regular season.

References

External links
Navy Midshipmen lacrosse bio
Navy Midshipmen football bio
TCU Horned Frogs bio

Living people
Players of American football from Maryland
American football linebackers
Navy Midshipmen men's lacrosse players
Navy Midshipmen football players
TCU Horned Frogs football players
Year of birth missing (living people)